C'eria Ricketts is a basketball player. She was selected in the 2012 WNBA Draft by the Phoenix Mercury, the 24th pick. She played basketball at the University of Arkansas.

Arkansas  statistics
Source

References

Year of birth missing (living people)
Living people
American women's basketball players
Arkansas Razorbacks women's basketball players
Basketball players from Louisville, Kentucky
Phoenix Mercury draft picks